Kerry Buck is a Canadian diplomat was the Permanent Representative and Ambassador to NATO.  Buck had joined Global Affairs Canada in 1991. from 2015 until 2019. Buck is a Senior Fellow at University of Ottawa's Graduate School of Public and International Affairs.

Education
Buck earned her undergraduate political science degree from the University of Western Ontario, a Bachelor of Laws and Bachelor of Civil Law in civil and common law from McGill University Faculty of Law.

Career
From 2011 until 2015, she was Political Director and Assistant Deputy Minister for International Security and Political Affairs.  

After serving at NATO, Buck was the Treasury Board of Canada Secretariat Assistant Secretary, Economic Sector from 2018 until 2021.

References

Permanent Representatives of Canada to NATO
Canadian women diplomats
McGill University Faculty of Law alumni
University of Western Ontario alumni
Academic staff of the University of Western Ontario
Year of birth missing (living people)
Living people